Odyssey Celeste Sims (born July 13, 1992) is an American professional basketball player for the Connecticut Sun of the  Women's National Basketball Association (WNBA). An AP and WBCA All-American, Sims was born in Irving, Texas and graduated from MacArthur High School.

High school

Sims was a 2010 graduate of MacArthur High School in Irving, Texas. She was rated the number one point guard in the class of 2010, earned the WBCA/State Farm National High School Player of the Year award and had her jersey retired.

College career
Sims attended Baylor University for four seasons. As a freshman, Sims was Named National Freshman of the Year, was named Big 12 Freshman of the Year and also to the All-Big 12 first team. In her sophomore season, Sims earned team Co-MVP honors with teammate Brittney Griner, scored in double-digits in 30 of 40 games and won an NCAA Championship after Baylor defeated Notre Dame 80–69 to win their second title in school history after a perfect 40–0 record during the season, making it the first time ever in college basketball history that a team has achieved such a record, they defeated Notre Dame 80–69 in the championship game to win their second title in school history. In her junior year, Sims was earned Co-MVP honors for the second straight year with Griner. In Big 12 statistics, she was ranked number 1 in assist/turnover ratio (2.7), number 3 in steals (2.8), number 4 in assists (5.8), and number 5 in free throw percentage (.832). In her senior year, Sims would statistically have the best season of her college career. She scored a career-high 48 points along with 10 rebounds in a 78–62 victory against West Virginia. She finished the season averaging 28.5 points per game.

Baylor statistics
Source

Professional career

WNBA

Sims was drafted 2nd overall by the Tulsa Shock in the 2014 WNBA draft. In her rookie season, Sims immediately entered the starting line-up for the Shock at the shooting guard position. Sims would instantly become a scoring sensation in the league; she scored a career-high 39 points in a 95–93 loss to the San Antonio Stars. She finished her rookie season, averaging a career-high 16.7 points per game along with a career-high 4.2 assists per game in 34 games with 31 starts and was named to the WNBA All-Rookie Team. The Shock finished fifth place in the Western Conference with a 12–22 record, missing out on the playoffs.

In 2015, Sims would have an injury-riddled season, she missed 10 games with a knee injury. She finished the season, with 23 games played along with 19 starts and averaged 16.0 points per game and 3.8 assists per game. The Shock would make the playoffs with the number 3 seed in the Western Conference, posting an 18–16 record, but were eliminated in a 2-game sweep by the Phoenix Mercury in the first round.

In 2016, the Tulsa Shock relocated to Dallas, Texas (which is approximately 15 miles away from Sims's hometown of Irving, Texas) and were renamed the Dallas Wings. In the 2016 season, Sims would be healthy; she played in 34 games with 30 starts and averaged 14.0 points per game along with 3.9 assists per game at shooting guard. The Wings missed out on playoff contention with an 11–23 record.

In 2017, Sims was traded to the Los Angeles Sparks along with the number 11 overall pick in the 2017 WNBA Draft in exchange for two first round picks in the 2017 WNBA Draft. She initially came off the bench, but would be inserted into the starting lineup at the shooting guard spot after Essence Carson suffered a right elbow sprain. On August 24, 2017, Sims scored a season-high 28 points along with 8 assists and 6 rebounds as a starter in an 82–67 victory over the Phoenix Mercury. The Sparks would finish with a 26–8 record as the number 2 seed in the league with a double-bye to the semi-finals, following last season's new playoff format. Heading into the playoffs, Sims remained the starting shooting guard for the Sparks. The Sparks would go on to advance to the Finals after defeating the Mercury in a 3-game sweep of the semi-finals, making it Sims’s first Finals appearance. Sims tied her playoff career-high of 22 points in Game 3 with the Sparks winning 89–87 to clinch their second consecutive berth to the Finals. However, the Sparks would lose in the Finals to the Minnesota Lynx in five games.

In February 2018, Sims re-signed with the Sparks in free agency. On May 20, 2018, in the Sparks' season opener, Sims scored a season-high 21 points in a 77–76 victory over the Minnesota Lynx. As the season went on, Sims would struggle and eventually would lose her starting position going into the playoffs. The Sparks finished as the number 6 seed in the league with a 19–15 record. In the first round elimination game, the Sparks defeated the Minnesota Lynx 75–68 to advance. In the second round elimination game, the Sparks would lose 96–64 to the Washington Mystics.

In 2019, Sims again re-signed with the Sparks after they matched an offer sheet made by the Phoenix Mercury. On April 22, 2019, Sims was traded to the Minnesota Lynx in exchange for Alexis Jones. Sims would be the starting point guard for the Lynx, her role enabled her to average a new career-high in assists. She would also end up being named an All-Star for the first time in her career after being voted into the 2019 WNBA All-Star Game and would make the All-WNBA Second Team. The Lynx finished the season 18–16 with the number 7 seed, but were eliminated by the Seattle Storm in the first round elimination game.

In 2020, the season was delayed and shortened to 22 games in a bubble at IMG Academy due to the COVID-19 pandemic. Sims was suspended for the first two regular season games without pay stemming from a DUI charge in October 2019 to which she pleaded guilty. She would end up missing more time after giving birth to her first child in April and eventually made her return in August. For the remainder of the team schedule, she started in 7 of the 13 games played, working her way back into the starting the lineup. The Lynx finished 14–8 with the number 4 seed, receiving a bye to the second round. In the second round elimination game, the Lynx edged out the Phoenix Mercury 80–79, advancing the franchise back to the semi-finals. However, in the semi-finals, they would get swept by the Seattle Storm who would end up being the eventual champions.

Sims signed a one-year contract with the Atlanta Dream for the 2021 season on 1 March 2021. She appeared in 30 games for the Dream, averaging 25.1 minutes and 8.7 points per game. The team went 8-24, missing the playoffs. 

On 3 May 2022, Sims re-signed with the Minnesota Lynx on an undisclosed contract. On 13 May 2022, after the Lynx began the season 0-3, Sims left the team via "mutual separation" as one of six roster moves made by the team.

On August 3, 2022, Sims signed a 7-day contract with the Connecticut Sun.

Overseas
In the 2014–15 WNBA off-season, Sims played for Bucheon KEB-Hana Bank in South Korea. In the 2015–16 WNBA off-season, Sims played for Abdullah Gül Üniversitesi B.K. in Turkey. As of August 2016, Sims signed with Botaş SK of the Turkish League for the 2016–17 WNBA off-season. In 2017, Sims signed with Adana ASKİ SK of the Turkish League for the 2017–18 WNBA off-season. In 2018, Sims signed with Kayseri Basketbol of the Turkish League during the 2018–19 WNBA off-season.

USA Basketball
Sims played on the team representing the US at the 2011 Summer Universiade held in Shenzhen, China. The team, coached by Bill Fennelly, won all six games to earn the gold medal. Sims averaged 6.2 points per game.

Sims was selected to be a member of the team representing the US at the 2013 Summer Universiade held in Kazan, Russia. The team, coached by Sherri Coale, won the opening four games easily, scoring in triple digits in each game, and winning by 30 or more points in each case. After winning the quarterfinal game against Sweden, they faced Australia in the semifinal. The USA team opened up as much as a 17 point in the fourth quarter of the game but the Australian team fought back and took a one-point lead in the final minute. Crystal Bradford scored a basket with 134 seconds left ant he game to secure a 79–78 victory. The gold medal opponent was Russia, but the USA team never trailed, and won 90–71 to win the gold medal and the World University games Championship. Sims was the third leading scorer for the team, averaging 12.7 points per game. She led the team in assists with 32, and steals with 12. She was named co-MVP of the tournament, along with  Russia's Tatiana Grigoryeva.

WNBA career statistics

Regular season

|-
| style="text-align:left;"| 2014
| style="text-align:left;"| Tulsa
| 34 || 31 || 34.4 || .406 || .346 || .839 || 2.8 || 4.2 || 1.3 || 0.3 || 2.1 || 16.7
|-
| style="text-align:left;"| 2015
| style="text-align:left;"| Tulsa
| 23 || 19 || 31.4 || .369 || .207 || .847 || 3.4 || 3.8 || 1.1 || 0.0 || 2.8 || 16.0
|-
| style="text-align:left;"| 2016
| style="text-align:left;"| Dallas
| 34 || 30 || 31.6 || .353 || .280 || .883 || 2.5 || 3.9 || 1.1 || 0.2 || 2.5 || 14.0
|-
| style="text-align:left;"| 2017
| style="text-align:left;"| Los Angeles
| 31 || 14 || 24.3 || .447 || .190 || .886 || 1.9 || 3.5 || 1.5 || 0.2 || 1.4 || 9.6
|-
| style="text-align:left;"| 2018
| style="text-align:left;"| Los Angeles
| 34 || 24 || 25.5 || .388  || .273 || .722  || 2.5 || 2.8 || 0.6 || 0.0 || 1.5 || 8.2
|-
| style="text-align:left;"| 2019
| style="text-align:left;"| Minnesota
| 34 || 34 || 31.9 || .415  || .269 || .795 || 3.4 || 5.4 || 1.4 || 0.1 || 3.3 || 14.5
|-
| style="text-align:left;"| 2020
| style="text-align:left;"| Minnesota
| 13 || 7 || 18.5 || .403 || .333 || .909 || 2.0 || 3.5 || 0.5 || 0.1 || 1.9 || 9.4
|-
| style="text-align:left;"| 2021
| style="text-align:left;"| Atlanta
| 30 || 21 || 25.1 || .370 || .232 || .729 || 2.5 || 3.6 || 1.2 || 0.1 || 1.6 || 8.7
|-
| style="text-align:left;"| 2022
| style="text-align:left;"| Minnesota
| 2 || 0 || 27.0 || .304 || .250 || .444 || 3.5 || 3.5 || 0.5 || 1.0 || 2.5 || 9.5
|-
| style="text-align:left;"| 2022
| style="text-align:left;"| Connecticut
| 5 || 0 || 18.2 || .333 || .273 || 1.000 || 1.2 || 2.6 || 1.4 || 0.0 || 1.4 || 5.8
|-
| style="text-align:left;"| Career
| style="text-align:left;"| 9 years, 5 teams
| 240 || 180 || 28.4 || .391 || .271 || .828 || 2.6 || 3.8 || 1.1 || 0.1 || 2.1 || 12.1

Playoffs

|-
| style="text-align:left;"| 2015
| style="text-align:left;"| Tulsa
| 2 || 2 || 33.6 || .336 || .333 || .786 || 4.0 || 5.0 || 2.0 || 0.0 || 2.0 || 20.0
|-
| style="text-align:left;"| 2017
| style="text-align:left;"| Los Angeles
| 8 || 8 || 34.8 || .442 || .346 || .929 || 2.4 || 3.6 || 1.3 || 0.0 || 3.1 || 15.9
|-
| style="text-align:left;"| 2018
| style="text-align:left;"| Los Angeles
| 2 || 0 || 14.4 || .375 || .500 || 1.000 || 2.5 || 1.5 || 1.0 || 0.0 || 0.0 || 4.5
|-
| style="text-align:left;"| 2019
| style="text-align:left;"| Minnesota
| 1 || 1 || 19.0 || .000 || .000 || .500  || 1.0 || 5.0 || 0.0 || 0.0 || 1.0 || 1.0
|-
| style="text-align:left;"| 2020
| style="text-align:left;"| Minnesota
| 4 || 4 || 32.8 || .412 || .231 || 1.000 || 3.3 || 4.3 || 1.8 || 0.0 || 2.8 || 15.3
|-
| style="text-align:left;"| 2022
| style="text-align:left;"| Connecticut
| 12 || 0 || 13.8 || .436 || .286 || .875 || 1.5 || 1.3 || 0.4 || 0.0 || 0.8 || 3.6
|-
| style="text-align:left;"| Career
| style="text-align:left;"| 6 years, 4 teams
| 29 || 15 || 23.8 || .412 || .305 || .900 || 2.2 || 2.7 || 1.0 || 0.0 || 1.8 || 9.7

Awards and honors
 2010—WBCA High School Coaches' All-America Team
 2014—ESPNW First Team All-American
 2014—USBWA All-American team 
 2014—Nancy Lieberman Award
 2014—Frances Pomeroy Naismith Award
 2014—Wade Trophy
 2014—Dawn Staley Award

References

External links
Official Website
Baylor Lady Bears bio

1992 births
Living people
All-American college women's basketball players
American women's basketball players
American expatriate basketball people in South Korea
Atlanta Dream players
Basketball players from Texas
Baylor Bears women's basketball players
Connecticut Sun players
Dallas Wings players
Los Angeles Sparks players
Medalists at the 2011 Summer Universiade
Medalists at the 2013 Summer Universiade
Minnesota Lynx players
Parade High School All-Americans (girls' basketball)
Point guards
People from Irving, Texas
Sportspeople from the Dallas–Fort Worth metroplex
Tulsa Shock draft picks
Tulsa Shock players
Universiade gold medalists for the United States
Universiade medalists in basketball
Women's Korean Basketball League players
United States women's national basketball team players
Women's National Basketball Association All-Stars